
Year 333 (CCCXXXIII) was a common year starting on Monday (link will display the full calendar) of the Julian calendar. At the time, it was known as the Year of the Consulship of Dalmatius and Zenophilus (or, less frequently, year 1086 Ab urbe condita). The denomination 333 for this year has been used since the early medieval period, when the Anno Domini calendar era became the prevalent method in Europe for naming years.

Events
 By place 
 Roman Empire 
 Flavius Dalmatius and Domitius Zenofilus are appointed consuls.
 Emperor Constantine the Great pulls Roman troops out of Britain, and abandons work on Hadrian's Wall.
 Calocaerus revolts against Constantine I and proclaims himself emperor. Flavius Dalmatius, responsible for the security of the eastern frontier, is sent to Cyprus to suppress the rebellion.
 December 25 – Constantine I elevates his youngest son Constans to the rank of Caesar at Constantinople.

 China 
 Shi Hong succeeds his father Shi Le as Emperor of the Later Zhao Empire, in the Period of the Sixteen Kingdoms, but Shi Hong's third cousin Shi Hu holds the real power. Empress Dowager Liu (widow of Shi Le) fails to get rid of Shi Hu, and Shi Hu has her deposed and killed.

Births 
 Saint Monica, Christian saint and mother of Augustine of Hippo (approximate date)

Deaths 
 Cheng Xia, Chinese official and politician
 Liu, Chinese empress of the Jie State (or Later Zhao)
 Murong Hui, Chinese chieftain and duke of Liaodong (b. 269)
 Shi Le, Chinese founder and emperor of the Jie State (b. 274)
 Xu Guang (or Jiwu), Chinese official, politician and adviser

References